The 2022 World Artistic Gymnastics Championships was held in Liverpool, United Kingdom at the Liverpool Arena, from 29 October to 6 November 2022. The United Kingdom previously hosted this event in 1993 (Birmingham), 2009 (London) and 2015 (Glasgow). 

The championships is a qualification event for the 2024 Olympic Games in Paris. The top three teams in both the men's and women's team finals will obtain five quota places for Paris, and qualify for the team event.

Competition schedule

Medal summary

Medalists
Names italicised denote the team alternate.

Medal standings

Overall

Men

Women

Men's results

Individual all-around

Floor

Pommel horse

Rings

Vault

Parallel bars

Horizontal bar

Women's results

Team

Individual all-around

Vault

Uneven bars

Balance beam

Floor

Qualification

Men

Team

Individual all-around

Floor exercise

Pommel horse

Rings

Vault

Parallel bars

Horizontal bar

Women

Team

Individual all-around

Vault

Uneven bars 
Mélanie de Jesus dos Santos and Alice D'Amato both qualified as R1 for receiving identical D and E scores.

Balance beam

Floor exercise

Olympic qualification

The following teams qualified a full team of five gymnasts to the 2024 Summer Olympics:

Men

 China
 Japan
 Great Britain

Women

 United States
 Great Britain
 Canada

Participating nations

References 

World Artistic Gymnastics Championships
World Artistic Gymnastics Championships
2022 in British sport
Gymnastics Championships
Sports competitions in Liverpool
International sports competitions in Liverpool
2020s in Liverpool
Gymnastics in the United Kingdom
World Artistic Gymnastics Championships
World Artistic Gymnastics Championships